CSLD may refer to:

 Cambridge Student Liberal Democrats
 Conway School of Landscape Design
 Cross-strait language database